Whiley is the surname of:

 Manning Whiley (1915–1975), British actor
 Richard Whiley (born 1935), English cricketer
 Jo Whiley (born 1965), English DJ
 Matthew Whiley (born 1980), English cricketer
 Jordanne Whiley (born 1992), British wheelchair tennis player
 Mark Whiley (born 1992), Australian rules footballer

See also
 Whiley (programming language)
 Wiley (disambiguation)
 Wily (disambiguation)
 Wylie (disambiguation)
 Wyllie
 Willey (disambiguation)
 Wylye (disambiguation)
 Wyle (disambiguation)
 Wyly
 Wile E. Coyote, a cartoon character whose name sounds similar to "Wily"